Under Ministerial Order n. 150/2004 of 13 February, issued by the Portuguese Ministry of Finance and consequently updated, Portugal defines an official blacklist of countries and jurisdictions considered for legal and tax purposes as tax havens.

Blacklisted Jurisdictions

Current Blacklisted Jurisdictions

Former Blacklisted Jurisdictions

Sanctions

National sanctions 
The Portuguese Tax Code foresees aggravated withholding tax, 35% tax rate, on capital income (interests and dividends) deriving from black listed jurisdictions and an aggravated municipal property tax of 7% on property owned by entities located in said jurisdiction. Portugal's "blacklist" is defined by decree issued by the Minister of Finance and taking into account confidential reports issued by the Portuguese Tax and Customs Authority.

In addition, non-habitual residents (NHRs) status holders do not benefit from personal income tax exemption on interests, dividends, capital gains, income from immovable property (rents), royalties, intellectual property income and business income) if: these are sourced from black-listed jurisdictions. Therefore, taxation of such income will be subject to the normal rates or to the 35% rate depending on the type of income earned by the NHR status holder.

European Union Sanctions 
On December 16, 2019, the EU Code of Conduct Group (Business Taxation) (CCG), under the Economic and Financial Affairs Council, published a new guidance on sanctions to be applied by EU Member States against blacklisted 'non-cooperative' jurisdictions by the end of 2020. These sanctions were immediately backed by the Finish Presidency of the Council of the European Union who labelled them as "defensive-measures"  that are recommended to EU Member States to take against blacklisted jurisdictions. Implementation of such sanctions by Portugal are expected to occur on January 1, 2021.

Criticism 
The list has been said to have violated EU Law by discriminating against a former EU-Member State's territory such as Gibraltar, therefore violating the principle of free movement of capital. Furthermore, the list does not take into account whether Portugal has in place a double taxation agreement with the blacklisted territory.

Critics also point out that the list is not clear given the fact that it makes no provisions regarding the dissolution of the Netherlands Antilles nor if countries such as Japan, Australia or New Zealand fall under the category of "other Pacific Islands." In addition, the Portuguese list does not mirror the list adopted by the European Union regarding tax aggressive and non-cooperative jurisdictions.

References 

International taxation
Economic globalization
International finance
Offshore finance
Tax avoidance
Taxation-related lists
Corporate tax avoidance
Tax evasion
Global issues
Offshore magic circle
Tax law